Presidential elections were held in Kiribati on 9 March 2016. The result was a victory for Taneti Maamau of the Tobwaan Kiribati Party, who received 60% of the vote, with Rimeta Beniamina (United Coalition Party, but nominated by Pillars of Truth) on 38.6% and Tianeti Ioane (also Pillars of Truth) 1.5%.

Results

References

Presidential elections in Kiribati
2016 in Kiribati
Kiribati
Election and referendum articles with incomplete results